Fenshui Township is an rural township in Xiangtan County, Xiangtan City, Hunan Province, People's Republic of China.

Administrative division
The township is divided into 32 villages, the following areas: Huxingshan Village, Haotou Village, Changfeng Village, Shuangfengchong Village, Shazhou Village, Fenshui'ao Village, Baishimiao Village, Shiqiao Village, Beilin Village, Yang'en Village, Xinba Village, Shitong Village, Zhenge Village, Huaishuwan Village, Xiaochong Village, Lihong Village, Penghe Village, Huanshan Village, Baishajing Village, Guanglin Village, Waye Village, Qujiang Village, Tonghe Village, Wantou Village, Tianlong Village, Jiaochang Village, Shijiang Village, Hejia Village, Shilong Village, Guangyang Village, Qishan Village, and Dalong Village.

History
In 1950, Fenshui Township was built.

Geography
Qujiang River flows through the town.

Dongfeng Reservoir is located in the town.

Economy
Fish, rice and pig are important to the economy.

Culture
Shadow play and Huaguxi are the most influence local theater.

Attractions
Sanjie Temple, was built in Qing Dynasty, is a famous tourist attraction.

Songzhen Bridge, was built in Song Dynasty, is a popular tourist attraction.

Celebrity
, politician.
, revolutionist.
Chen Pengnian, politician.

References

External links

Divisions of Xiangtan County